Viktor Nikolayevich Chakrygin (25 January 1984 – 9 January 2022) was a Russian professional footballer who played as a goalkeeper.

Club career
Chakrygin made his Russian Football National League debut for FC Dynamo Makhachkala on 6 November 2005 in a game against FC Chkalovets-1936 Novosibirsk. He played two more seasons in the FNL for Dynamo and FC Anzhi Makhachkala.

Death
He died on 9 January 2022, at the age of 37. 16 days before his 38th birthday., the club's press service reported without naming the cause of death.

References

External links
 
 

1984 births
2022 deaths
Russian footballers
Association football goalkeepers
FC Anzhi Makhachkala players
FC Oryol players
FC Dynamo Makhachkala players